Jorge Camacho (born 13 March 1956) is a Bolivian footballer. He played in five matches for the Bolivia national football team from 1980 to 1983. He was also part of Bolivia's squad for the 1983 Copa América tournament.

References

1956 births
Living people
Bolivian footballers
Bolivia international footballers
Place of birth missing (living people)
Association football midfielders
Oriente Petrolero players